Kanuru Heggaditi or Kanooru Heggadithi (meaning: Proprietress of Kanuru) is a Kannada language novel written by author and poet, Kuvempu, in 1936. Based on the novel, a Kannada movie Kanooru Heggadithi directed by Girish Karnad, was released in 1999.

See also
Chikmagalur, an area relating to the article
Sri Ramayana Darshanam, an epic written by Kuvempu
Malegalalli madumagalu, a novel written by Kuvempu
Kannada literature
Kannada poetry
Rashtrakavi (meaning: National poet), a list of poets with the title

References

1936 novels
Novels set in Karnataka
Kannada novels
20th-century Indian novels
Indian novels adapted into films